Rowland Wilson may refer to:

Rowland Wilson (cricketer) (1868–1959), English clergyman
Rowland Wilson (politician) (1613–1650), English politician
Rowland B. Wilson (1930–2005), American cartoonist